Kampong Sungai Matan is a village in Brunei-Muara District, Brunei. It is one of the villages within Mukim Kota Batu. The postcode is BD1917.

Accolades 
In 2012, the village won the Bronze Medal of the Excellent Village Award, a national award which recognises outstanding socioeconomic initiatives by villages in the country.

References 

Sungai Matan